Ali Saleh Al-Saleh (born 1942) is a politician from Bahrain who is serving as Chairmen and President of Consultative Council of Bahrain from December 2006. He also served as Minister of Commerce and Industry from 1995 to 2004.

References 

Bahraini politicians
Living people
1942 births
Members of the Consultative Council (Bahrain)
Government ministers of Bahrain